"Reunion" is a song by French electronic music artist M83. The track was released in the United Kingdom on 5 February 2012 as the second single from the group's sixth studio album, Hurry Up, We're Dreaming. The track was remixed by Polly Scattergood.

Music video
The music video for "Reunion" has garnered a high number of individual views through online venues such as YouTube since its release. The video is a companion piece to the music video created for the previous single, "Midnight City", continuing the story of a group of children with various psychic abilities as they are pursued by their shadowy handlers in an attempt to recover them. The story is concluded with the video for the single "Wait".

The video starts with the telekinetic children on the top of an old warehouse where they tested their abilities in the music video for "Midnight City", after combining all of their powers to make the sun set. The youngest child starts glowing, and when the light coming from her gets bright enough, she dies. The scene cuts away to a room where the handlers are studying monitors, trying to track the rogue children. One psychic child who stayed behind is also in the room, sitting in a wheelchair behind the handlers and tethered to a machine with cables. Her eyes glow red-orange, with a hateful glare on her face, and it appears she was responsible for the glowing murder of the youngest rogue child, by using her power from afar. This enabled the government handlers to determine their location, like a beacon.

Back on the warehouse rooftop, one of the older female children comes to embrace the fallen child, but at the same time, agents of the handlers have closed in on their location and are driving towards them in an SUV. One of the boys, the leader, tries to get the older girl to leave the body of the dead girl behind, which she eventually, reluctantly does. The escaped children run down the street from the fast approaching agents, but reach a dead end.

The lead boy stops running, and turns to confront the SUV, his eyes beginning to glow silver-blue. The driver gets out and slowly approaches; at this point, the scene is inter-cut with images of the evil psychic girl, her eyes glowing red-orange and concentrating, and it is clear that she is controlling the adult driver, channelling her power through him like a conduit. He raises his arms, and the SUV begins to lift into the air and float, before launching forward towards the cornered children. The lead escaped boy uses his power to stop the SUV, pushing it back and holding it in the air, straining with his all power. The girl back in the lab also strains to retain the upper hand in the battle of wills. The other escaped children raise their hands to help the boy, as do other children who run on screen from the connecting streets (it is not clear where they came from, but they are presumed psychics as well).

Eventually, the rogue children's power is too great for the evil girl, and the SUV is flung back into the agents, presumably killing them. Back in the monitoring station, the girl slumps in her chair, defeated, but also suddenly alert. As the handlers continue staring into the monitors, she pulls the cables off of herself, gets out of her wheelchair, and walks away.

The escaped children, with their new friends, take refuge in an abandoned cathedral. Each of them stands in a circle near the altar, hands outstretched. They begin to glow softly, slowly getting brighter until it's dazzling, and seemingly under their own power, unlike what happened to the young girl. The scene then cuts away abruptly to a shot of the Earth, from space. A large, glowing ball of white light rises out of the atmosphere and starts drifting into space, carrying the children away.

The location filmed at the start of the video is in Los Angeles.

The final fate of the children and the Earth is explored in the final video of the trilogy, "Wait" in which the civilisation is nearly destroyed in a cataclysm .

As with the previous music video, "Midnight City", the artists cited Akira as a major source of inspiration for the storyline. Both the 1988 animated film and the two music videos explore the idea of psychic children being abused and pursued by government agents.

Charts

Release history

References

External links
 

2011 songs
2012 singles
M83 (band) songs
Mute Records singles
Songs written by Morgan Kibby